Phytoecia argus is a species of beetle in the family Cerambycidae. It was described by Frölich in 1793. It has a wide distribution in Europe.

References

Phytoecia
Beetles described in 1793